Layla Guscoth (born 2 March 1992) is an England netball international. She was a member of the England squad that won a bronze medal at the 2019 Netball World Cup. At club level, Guscoth has played for Loughborough Lightning, Hertfordshire Mavericks and Team Bath in the Netball Superleague and for Adelaide Thunderbirds in Suncorp Super Netball. She was a member of the Mavericks team that won the 2011 Netball Superleague. She has captained both Mavericks and Thunderbirds. In 2016 she qualified as a doctor.

Early life and education
Guscoth was born in Birmingham, West Midlands and began playing netball at the age of 11. She discovered an interest in medicine during a hospital work experience placement in sixth form. Between 2010 and 2013 she studied medicine at St John's College, Oxford. In 2012 she was placed third in a top ten list of black students at universities in the United Kingdom. Judges included Trevor Phillips and David Lammy. In 2016 she completed her medical studies at University College London and was awarded a BMBS with Distinction. Guscoth also played netball at intervarsity level for both Oxford University and UCL.

Playing career

Netball Superleague
Loughborough Lightning
During the 2009–10 Netball Superleague season, Guscoth played for Loughborough Lightning.

Hertfordshire Mavericks
Between 2011 and 2016, 
Guscoth played for Hertfordshire Mavericks. She was a member of the Mavericks team that won the 2011 Netball Superleague and in the grand final she was named player of the match. In 2014 she was voted the Netball Superleague Player of the Season after winning 59% of the vote in a Sky Sports poll. In 2015 she made her second grand final appearance for Mavericks. She captained Mavericks during the 2016 Netball Superleague season.

Team Bath
Between 2016 and 2018, Guscoth played for Team Bath. Guscoth was named the Team Bath Coaches' Player of the Year in both 2017 and 2018.

Adelaide Thunderbirds
Since 2019 Guscoth has played for Adelaide Thunderbirds in Suncorp Super Netball. Guscoth and her England international teammate Chelsea Pitman were appointed co-captains of Thunderbirds for 2019.

England
Guscoth made her senior debut for England in 2012 against Jamaica. She has also represented  England at under-17, under-19 and under-21 levels, captaining both the under-17 and under-21 squads. Between 2015 and 2018 Guscoth took a break from playing for England as she concentrated on qualifying to be a doctor. Guscoth was a member of the England squad that won a bronze medal at the 2019 Netball World Cup. However she was injured in a group stage match against Scotland and she missed the remainder of the tournament.

Doctor
While playing for Team Bath in 2017 and 2018, Guscoth also worked as a doctor at Royal United Hospital and Southmead Hospital. In 2019, while playing for Adelaide Thunderbirds, she also worked as a researcher/visiting lecturer at the University of Adelaide. During the COVID-19 pandemic, when the 2020 Suncorp Super Netball season was suspended, Guscoth volunteered to return to the United Kingdom to work at Queen Elizabeth Hospital Birmingham.

Honours
Hertfordshire Mavericks
Netball Superleague
Winners: 2011: 1
Runners up: 2015: 1
England
Netball Quad Series
Runners Up: 2018 (Sep), 2019 2
Individual
Netball Superleague Player of the Season
 2014

References

1992 births
Living people
English netball players
2019 Netball World Cup players
Netball Superleague players
Loughborough Lightning netball players
Mavericks netball players
Team Bath netball players
Suncorp Super Netball players
Adelaide Thunderbirds players
English expatriate netball people in Australia
Black British sportswomen
Sportspeople from Birmingham, West Midlands
English women medical doctors
Medical doctors from the West Midlands (county)
21st-century English medical doctors
Alumni of St John's College, Oxford
Alumni of University College London
Academic staff of the University of Adelaide
21st-century English women
Netball players at the 2022 Commonwealth Games